Carl is a town in Barrow County, Georgia, United States. The population was 269 at the 2016 census.

History
The Georgia General Assembly incorporated the town in 1908 under the name "Lawson". The present name of "Carl" was named after the infant son of early settlers.

Geography
Carl is located in western Barrow County at  (34.006635, -83.812016). It is bordered on its west side by the city of Auburn.

Demographics

As of the census of 2000, there were 205 people, 90 households, and 59 families residing in the town. The racial makeup of the town was 92.20% White, 2.93% African American, 4.39% from other races, and 0.49% from two or more races. Hispanic or Latino people of any race were 4.39% of the population.

There were 90 households, out of which 18.9% had children under the age of 18 living with them, 55.6% were married couples living together, 4.4% had a female householder with no husband present, and 34.4% were non-families. 30.0% of all households were made up of individuals, and 16.7% had someone living alone who was 65 years of age or older.  The average household size was 2.28 and the average family size was 2.80.

In the town, the population was spread out, with 16.6% under the age of 18, 6.3% from 18 to 24, 29.8% from 25 to 44, 26.3% from 45 to 64, and 21.0% who were 65 years of age or older.  The median age was 43 years. For every 100 females, there were 122.8 males.  For every 100 females age 18 and over, there were 116.5 males.

The median income for a household in the town was $45,417, and the median income for a family was $56,250. Males had a median income of $32,356 versus $23,500 for females. The per capita income for the town was $20,948.  About 1.5% of families and 6.1% of the population were below the poverty line, including 8.0% of those under the age of eighteen and 10.9% of those 65 or over.

References

Towns in Barrow County, Georgia
Towns in Georgia (U.S. state)
1908 establishments in Georgia (U.S. state)
Populated places established in 1908